The 1939–40 season was the 41st season in the history of Berner Sport Club Young Boys. The team played their home games at Stadion Wankdorf in Bern and placed 5th in the Nationalliga, and was then eliminated in the semi-finals of the Swiss Cup.

Overview

Players
 Maurice Glur
 Achille Siegrist
 Louis Gobet
 Otto Hänni
 Hans Liniger
 Cuany
 Fritz Knecht
 Hans Blaser
 Willy Terretaz
 Zulliger
 Olivier Eggimann

Competitions

Overall record

Nationalliga

League table

Matches

Swiss Cup

References

BSC Young Boys seasons
Swiss football clubs 1939–40 season